Wilhelm Eduard Weber (24 October 1804 – 23 June 1891) was a German physicist and, together with Carl Friedrich Gauss, inventor of the first electromagnetic telegraph.

Biography

Early years
Weber was born in Schlossstrasse in Wittenberg, where his father, Michael Weber, was professor of theology. The building had previously been the home of Abraham Vater. 

Wilhelm was the second of three brothers, all of whom were distinguished by an aptitude for science.  After the dissolution of the University of Wittenberg his father was transferred to Halle in 1815. Wilhelm had received his first lessons from his father, but was now sent to the Orphan Asylum and Grammar School at Halle. After that he entered the University, and devoted himself to natural philosophy. He distinguished himself so much in his classes, and by original work, that after taking his degree of Doctor and becoming a Privatdozent he was appointed Professor Extraordinary of natural philosophy at Halle.

Career
In 1831, on the recommendation of Carl Friedrich Gauss, he was hired by the University of Göttingen as professor of physics, at the age of twenty-seven. His lectures were interesting, instructive, and suggestive. Weber thought that, in order to thoroughly  understand physics and apply it to daily life, mere lectures, though illustrated by experiments, were insufficient, and he encouraged his students to experiment themselves, free of charge, in the college laboratory. As a student of twenty years he, with his brother, Ernst Heinrich Weber, Professor of Anatomy at Leipzig, had written a book on the Wave Theory and Fluidity, which brought its authors a considerable reputation. Acoustics was a favourite science of his, and he published numerous papers upon it in Poggendorffs Annalen, Schweigger's Jahrbücher für Chemie und Physik, and the musical journal Carcilia. The 'mechanism of walking in mankind' was another study, undertaken in conjunction with his younger brother, Eduard Weber. These important investigations were published between the years 1825 and 1838. Gauss and Weber constructed the first electromagnetic telegraph in 1833, which connected the observatory with the institute for physics in Göttingen.

In December 1837, the Hanoverian government dismissed Weber, one of the Göttingen Seven, from his post at the university for political reasons. Weber then travelled for a time, visiting England, among other countries, and became professor of physics in Leipzig from 1843 to 1849, when he was reinstated at Göttingen. One of his most important works, co-authored with Carl Friedrich Gauss and Carl Wolfgang Benjamin Goldschmidt, was Atlas des Erdmagnetismus: nach den Elementen der Theorie entworfen (Atlas of Geomagnetism: Designed according to the elements of the theory), a series of magnetic maps, and it was chiefly through his efforts that magnetic observatories were instituted. He studied magnetism with Gauss, and during 1864 published his Electrodynamic Proportional Measures containing a system of absolute measurements for electric currents, which forms the basis of those in use. Weber died in Göttingen, where he is buried in the same cemetery as Max Planck and Max Born.

He was elected a foreign member of the Royal Swedish Academy of Sciences in 1855.

In 1855 with Rudolf Kohlrausch (1809–1858) he demonstrated that the ratio of electrostatic to electromagnetic units produced a number that matched the speed of light. This finding led to Maxwell's conjecture that light is an electromagnetic wave. This also led to Weber's development of his theory of electrodynamics. Also, the first usage of the letter "c" to denote the speed of light was in an 1856 paper by Kohlrausch and Weber.

International recognition

The SI unit of magnetic flux, the weber (symbol: Wb) is named after him.

Works
 Elektrodynamische Maaßbestimmungen : insbesondere Zurückführung der Stromintensitäts-Messungen auf mechanisches Maass (with Wilhelm Weber) 1857. "Electrodynamic Measurements, Especially Attributing Mechanical Units to Measures of Current Intensity". German text. English translation

See also
 German inventors and discoverers
 International System of Electrical and Magnetic Units
 Bifilar coil
 Needle telegraph
 Vector magnetic potential
 Weber electrodynamics

References

Bibliography
 
  – obituary
  – Telegraph of Weber and Gauss (with pictures)

External links

 Biography and bibliography in the Virtual Laboratory of the Max Planck Institute for the History of Science
 Wilhelm Weber's Works Translated into English A bibliography compiled by A.K.T. Assis in 21st Century Science and Technology  2009-2010

1804 births
1891 deaths
People from Wittenberg
People from the Electorate of Saxony
19th-century German physicists
People associated with electricity
Martin Luther University of Halle-Wittenberg alumni
Academic staff of the Martin Luther University of Halle-Wittenberg
Academic staff of the University of Göttingen
Academic staff of Leipzig University
Members of the Royal Swedish Academy of Sciences
Foreign Members of the Royal Society
Recipients of the Pour le Mérite (civil class)
Recipients of the Matteucci Medal
Recipients of the Copley Medal